Krasnoselsk is a rural locality (a selo) in Ynyrginskoye Rural Settlement of Choysky District, the Altai Republic, Russia. The population was 228 as of 2016. There are 7 streets.

Geography 
Krasnoselsk is located 39 km southeast of Choya (the district's administrative centre) by road. Ynyrga is the nearest rural locality.

Ethnicity 
The village is inhabited by Altaians, Kazakhs.

References 

Rural localities in Choysky District